The Kryvyi Rih trolleybus system forms part of the public transport network serving Kryvyi Rih, Ukraine.

History
In operation since 1957, the system presently comprises 23 routes, and is managed by the Kryvyi Rih City Council.  It uses a fleet of 76 trolleybuses, which partly are articulated vehicles. On 1 May 2021 Kryvyi Rih became the first city in Ukraine to introduce free travel in public transport for its citizens. In order not to pay for municipal transport one must show a special electronic "Kryvyi Rih Card".

Network 
  Пл. Визволення — ст. Кривий Ріг-Головний
  Пл. Визволення — тролейбусне депо No.2
  ст. Кривий Ріг — ст. Кривий Ріг-Головний
  пл. 30-річчя Перемоги — пл. Толстого
  к-тр Зарічний — ЦГЗК
  к-тр Зарічний — ст. Роковата (працює у вихідні дні та на свята)
  Пл. Визволення — ПівдГЗК
  Пл. Визволення — КЦРЗ
  Спорткомплекс — ККХП-2
  Спорткомплекс — ПівнГЗК(РЗФ-1)
  ст. Кривий Ріг — КЦРЗ (через м-н Юність)
  Пл. Визволення — ст. Кривий Ріг  — пл. Горького  — пл. Визволення (кільцевий)
  Пл. Визволення — пл. Горького — Пл. Визволення (кільцевий, у зворотному напрямку маршруту No.12)
  КЦРЗ-КЦРЗ (ч/з Юність, Більшовик, Піонер, 173 кв.)
  ПівнГЗК(РЗФ-1) — РЗФ-2
  ПЗРК — 10-й мікрорайон (раз на годину)
  "Електрозаводська"— пл. Толстого
   Спорткомплекс — 10-й мікрорайон (раз на 2 години)
   Пл. Визволення — Розвилка
   Пл. Визволення — ст. Кривий Ріг-Головний (через Розвилку)
   ст. Кривий Ріг — ст. Кривий Ріг-Головний (через Розвилку)
   вул. Серафимовича — вул. Вернадського (кільцевий)
   ст Роковата — Пл. Визволення

Rolling stock

Current fleet

See also

List of trolleybus systems in Ukraine

References

External links

Trolleybus transport in Ukraine
Kryvyi Rih
Kryvyi Rih
1957 establishments in Ukraine
Transport in Kryvyi Rih
Tourist attractions in Kryvyi Rih